Brunei competed in the 2017 Southeast Asian Games in Malaysia from 19 to 30 August 2017.

Competitors

Medal summary

Medal by sport

Medal by Date

Medalists

References

South
2017

Nations at the 2017 Southeast Asian Games